The North Wales Express was a weekly English language newspaper published in Caernarfon, Wales between 1877 and 1884. Its circulation area was Caernarfon, Bangor, and surrounding areas of north Wales. After 371 issues it merged with The Bangor Observer and North Wales Advertiser to form The North Wales Observer and Express, in which guise it continued to be published until 1921.

References

Newspapers published in Wales
1877 establishments in Wales
1884 disestablishments in Wales
Publications established in 1877
Publications disestablished in 1884